The 2000 congressional elections in Arizona were elections for Arizona's delegation to the United States House of Representatives, which occurred along with congressional elections nationwide on November 7, 2000. Arizona has six seats, as apportioned during the 1990 United States Census.  Republicans held five seats and Democrats held one seat.

Overview

References

United States House of Representatives
Arizona
2000